Robert Phillip Haire (born May 1, 1936, in Caretta, West Virginia) is a former Democratic member of the North Carolina General Assembly representing the state's one hundred nineteenth House district, including constituents in Haywood, Jackson, Macon and Swain counties. An attorney from Sylva, North Carolina, Haire served a total of seven terms in the state House. He announced in December 2011 that he would not seek another term in the House.

Recent electoral history

2010

2008

2006

2004

2002

References

External links

|-

Living people
Democratic Party members of the North Carolina House of Representatives
People from Sylva, North Carolina
1936 births
21st-century American politicians